George Jacob Benner (April 13, 1859 – December 30, 1930) was a Democratic member of the U.S. House of Representatives from Pennsylvania.

George J. Benner was born in Gettysburg, Pennsylvania.  He attended the public schools and was graduated from Pennsylvania College at Gettysburg, Pennsylvania, in 1878.  He taught school for several years, studied law, was admitted to the Adams County, Pennsylvania, bar in 1881 and commenced practice in Gettysburg.  He was a delegate to the Democratic State convention in 1886.

Benner was elected as a Democrat to the Fifty-fifth Congress.  He was not a candidate for renomination in 1898.  He resumed the practice of law in Gettysburg.  He was an unsuccessful candidate for election as president judge of the thirty-first judicial district in 1925.  He died in Gettysburg in 1930 and was buried at Evergreen Cemetery.

Sources

The Political Graveyard

1859 births
1930 deaths
People from Gettysburg, Pennsylvania
Pennsylvania lawyers
Gettysburg College alumni
Burials at Evergreen Cemetery (Adams County, Pennsylvania)
Democratic Party members of the United States House of Representatives from Pennsylvania